Martti Einar Korkia-Aho (12 September 1930, Alajärvi – 19 January 2012) was a Finnish businessman and politician. He was a member of the Parliament of Finland from 1987 to 1991, representing the National Coalition Party.

References

1930 births
2012 deaths
People from Alajärvi
Finnish Lutherans
National Coalition Party politicians
Members of the Parliament of Finland (1987–91)
20th-century Lutherans